This page documents all tornadoes confirmed by various weather forecast offices of the National Weather Service in the United States throughout June and July 2018. Tornado counts are considered preliminary until final publication in the database of the National Centers for Environmental Information.

United States yearly total

June

June 1 event

June 3 event

June 6 event

June 7 event

June 8 event

June 9 event

June 10 event

June 11 event

June 12 event

June 13 event

June 14 event

June 15 event

June 16 event

June 17 event

June 18 event

June 19 event

June 20 event

June 21 event

June 22 event

June 23 event

June 24 event

June 25 event

June 26 event

June 27 event

June 28 event

June 29 event

June 30 event

July

July 4 event

July 5 event

July 8 event

July 9 event

July 10 event

July 11 event

July 12 event

July 13 event

July 14 event

July 17 event

July 18 event

July 19 event

July 20 event

July 21 event

July 22 event

July 23 event

July 24 event

July 25 event

July 26 event

July 27 event

July 28 event

July 29 event

July 30 event

July 31 event

See also
 Tornadoes of 2018
 List of United States tornadoes in May 2018
 List of United States tornadoes from August to October 2018

Notes

References

2018 natural disasters in the United States
2018-related lists
Tornadoes of 2018
Tornadoes
2018, 06